The  are the imperial regalia of Japan and consist of the sword , the mirror , and the jewel . They represent the three primary virtues: valour (the sword), wisdom (the mirror), and benevolence (the jewel). The actual historical status of these legendary treasures is unknown as they are intentionally kept from public view to symbolize authority.

Legend
According to legend, these treasures were brought to Earth by Ninigi-no-Mikoto, legendary ancestor of the Japanese imperial line, when his grandmother, the sun goddess Amaterasu, sent him to pacify Japan. These treasures were eventually said to be passed down to Emperor Jimmu, who was the first Emperor of Japan and was also Ninigi's great-grandson. Traditionally, they were a symbol of the emperor's divinity as a descendant of Amaterasu, confirming his legitimacy as paramount ruler of Japan. When Amaterasu hid in a cave from her brother Susanoo-no-Mikoto, thus plunging the world in darkness, the goddess Ame-no-Uzume-no-Mikoto hung the mirror and jewels outside the cave and lured her out of the cave, at which point she saw her own reflection and was startled enough that the gods could extract her. Susanoo later presented the sword Kusanagi to Amaterasu as a token of apology; he had obtained it from the body of an eight-headed serpent, Yamata no Orochi.

At the conclusion of the Genpei War in 1185, the six-year-old Emperor Antoku and the Regalia were under the control of the Taira clan. They were present when the Taira were defeated by the rival Minamoto clan at the Battle of Dan-no-ura, which was fought on boats in the shallow Kanmon Straits. The child emperor's grandmother threw herself, the boy, the sword, and the jewel into the sea to avoid capture. The mirror was recovered, but according to the main account of the battle, a Minamoto soldier who tried to force open the box containing it was struck blind. The jewel was recovered shortly afterwards by divers, but the sword was lost. There are a number of medieval texts relating to the loss of the sword, which variously contended that a replica was forged afterwards, or that the lost sword itself was a replica, or the sword was returned to land by supernatural forces. The importance of the Imperial Regalia to Japan is evident from the declarations made by Emperor Hirohito to Kōichi Kido on 25 and 31 July 1945 at the end of World War II, when he ordered the Lord Keeper of the Privy Seal of Japan to protect them "at all costs".

Role

Since 690, the presentation of these items to the Emperor by the priests at the shrine has been a central element of the enthronement ceremony. This ceremony is not public, and these items are by tradition seen only by the Emperor and certain priests. While their actual locations are not confirmed, it is commonly thought that the sword is located at the Atsuta Shrine in Nagoya, the jewel is located at the Three Palace Sanctuaries in Kōkyo (the Imperial Palace in Tokyo), and the mirror is located at the Ise Grand Shrine in Mie Prefecture. Their first post-World War II enthronement appearance occurred during the accession and enthronement of Akihito in 1989 and 1990. Aside from their presence during the abdication of Akihito on 30 April 2019, their latest appearance occurred during the enthronement of Emperor Naruhito. He formally took possession of the regalia in a brief ceremony on 1 May 2019. The items themselves were never revealed during these public occasions as they remained shrouded from view in packages or boxes.

When these items are not being used for their ceremonial purpose, their supposed locations are kept off limits to the public. Mikael Adolphson a professor at Cambridge University stated that this hidden strategy "adds mystique, and thus, authority, to the objects." He went on to say that Shinto religious tradition is "especially protective" of its symbols. There is a general reluctance in Japan to allow a historical analysis of the regalia as such an assessment could potentially "de-mythologize" the items. 

Scholars consider the imperial regalia to represent the fusion of Japan's ancient indigenous groups with new arrivals. The three treasures are a symbol that the emperor should unite the ethnic groups without discrimination.

Cultural references

 The phrase "Three Sacred Treasures" is retrospectively applied to durable goods of modern Japan. During a policy address in 2003, then-Prime Minister Junichiro Koizumi said that during the mid-1950s and mid-1960s, the "three sacred treasures" for durable goods were the washing machine, refrigerator, and the black and white television, and the automobile, air conditioner, and color television set from the mid-1960s to the mid-1970s.
 Alvin and Heidi Toffler's Powershift use them to symbolize the three kinds of power they distinguish: force (sword), wealth (jewel) and knowledge (mirror).
 In Pretty Soldier Sailor Moon, a popular Japanese manga and anime franchise, the three talismans of the Outer Senshi are stylized as a mirror, sword and jewel. When brought together, they manifest the Holy Grail.
 In the One Piece manga by Eiichiro Oda, the character Kizaru - who has the ability to transmutate into light - has fighting techniques named for each of the Three Sacred Treasures. 
 In the popular King of Fighters video game series, the regalia form the icons of the three sacred treasures of the Kusanagi, Yagami and Kagura families.
 In The Legend of Zelda: A Link to the Past, the three essential items for travelling in the Dark World are the Magic Mirror, the Moon Pearl, and the Master Sword.
 In Final Fantasy XIV: Stormblood, the Primal Susano was contained in three treasures sacred to the tortoise-like Kojin of the Ruby Sea; the sword Ame no Murakumo, the mirror Yata-no-Kagami, and the gem Yasakani-no-Magatama. When the three treasures were brought together, Susano was restored and challenged the player to battle.
 In Noragami, the shinkis, i.e. spirits that gods use for various tasks and purposes, of the Sun Goddess Amaterasu are called "three sacred treasures"; they are named "Mikagami" (the mirror), "Mitama" (the magatama jewel), and "Mitsurugi" (the sword).
 In Ōkami, Amaterasu uses three types of divine instruments based on the three sacred treasures: Reflectors (the mirror), Rosaries (the jewels), and Glaives (the sword).
 In Naruto, Orochimaru uses the "Kusanagi Blade" against the third hokage. One of the attacks of Itachi is Yasakani beads

See also
 Chrysanthemum Throne
 National seals of Japan
 Order of the Sacred Treasure
 Jinnō Shōtōki
 Twelve Ornaments, China's counterparts to the Japanese Imperial Regalia
 Ashtamangala, the eight Buddhist treasures
 Bagua, the eight Taoist symbols

References

Crown jewels
Japanese monarchy
Japanese mythology
Mythological objects
National symbols of Japan
Japan